INXS (a phonetic play on "in excess") were an Australian rock band, formed as the Farriss Brothers in 1977 in Sydney, New South Wales. The founding members were bassist Garry Gary Beers, main composer and keyboardist Andrew Farriss, drummer Jon Farriss, guitarist Tim Farriss, lead singer and main lyricist Michael Hutchence, and guitarist and saxophonist Kirk Pengilly. For 20 years, INXS was fronted by Hutchence, whose magnetic stage presence made him the focal point of the band. Initially known for their new wave/pop style, the band later developed a harder pub rock style that included funk and dance elements.

In 1984, INXS had their first number-one hit in Australia with "Original Sin". The band achieved international success in the mid-to-late 1980s and early 1990s with the hit albums Listen Like Thieves, Kick, and X, and the singles "What You Need", "Need You Tonight" (the band's only US number-one single), "Devil Inside", "Never Tear Us Apart", "Suicide Blonde" and "New Sensation".

After Hutchence's death on 22 November 1997, INXS made appearances with several guest singers, and toured and recorded with Jon Stevens as lead singer, beginning in 2000. In 2005, members of INXS participated in Rock Star: INXS, a reality television series that culminated in the selection of Canadian J.D. Fortune as their new lead singer. Irish singer-songwriter Ciaran Gribbin replaced Fortune as lead singer in 2011. During a concert on 11 November 2012, INXS stated that the performance would be their last, although they did not announce the band's permanent retirement.

INXS won six Australian Recording Industry Association (ARIA) awards, including three for "Best Group" in 1987, 1989 and 1992; the band was inducted into the ARIA Hall of Fame in 2001. INXS has sold over 70 million albums worldwide, making them one of Australia's highest selling music acts of all time.

History

Early years
The origins of the band began with Andrew Farriss convincing his fellow Davidson High School classmate, Michael Hutchence, to join his band, Doctor Dolphin. The band contained two further classmates, Kent Kerny and Neil Sanders, as well as Garry Beers and Geoff Kennely, both from a nearby high school, Forest High School. In 1977, Tim Farriss, Andrew's older brother, invited Andrew, Hutchence and Beers to join him and his schoolmate Kirk Pengilly. Tim and Pengilly had been playing together since 1971 as either an acoustic duo, Kirk and Tim, or as a four-piece band called Guinness (named after their bass player's dog). Together with younger brother Jon Farriss they formed "The Farriss Brothers", who consisted of Garry Beers on bass guitar, Andrew Farriss on keyboards, Jon Farriss on drums, Tim Farriss on lead guitar, Michael Hutchence on lead vocals and Kirk Pengilly on guitar and saxophone. The band made their debut on 16 August 1977 at Whale Beach, 40 km (25 mi) north of Sydney.

The parents of the Farriss boys relocated to Perth, Western Australia in 1978, taking Jon to continue his schooling and, as soon as Hutchence and Andrew finished school, the rest of the band followed. They briefly performed as The Vegetables, singing "We Are the Vegetables", before returning to Sydney ten months later, where they recorded a set of demos. At a chance meeting in the car park of the Royal Antler, a pub in Narrabeen on the Northern Beaches of Sydney, New South Wales, Tim was approached by Gary Morris, the manager of Midnight Oil.

The band began to regularly support Midnight Oil and other local bands. Morris advised that a member of the Oils crew had come up with a new name and suggested they change it to INXS. The name INXS was inspired by English band XTC and Australian jam makers IXL. Pengilly later explained that Morris was interested in turning the group into a Christian band, which the band briefly considered before rejecting the idea.

The band's first performance as INXS was on 1 September 1979 at the Ocean Beach Hotel in Umina on the Central Coast of New South Wales and by the end of 1979, after passing on the Christian band image, they hired Chris "CM" Murphy as their manager and continued taking on the Oz pub circuit. Murphy was an adept business manager and negotiator and by early 1980 the band had signed a five-album record deal with a Sydney independent label, Deluxe Records, run by Michael Browning, a former manager of AC/DC.

1980s

From "Simple Simon" to Shabooh Shoobah
INXS released their first single, "Simple Simon"/"We Are the Vegetables", in Australia and France in May 1980. The single had its debut TV performance on Simon Townsend's Wonder World. Their self-titled debut album, INXS, was recorded at Trafalgar Studios in Annandale, Sydney. It was co-produced by the band and Duncan McGuire (ex-Ayers Rock), with all songs attributed to the entire band, at the insistence of Murphy. Deluxe gave them a budget of $10,000 to record the album, so to keep within the budget they had to record from midnight to dawn, usually after doing one or more performances earlier that night. The album was released in October 1980. It featured "Just Keep Walking" which was their first Australian Top 40 single, with the album peaking in the Top 30 of the Kent Music Report for Australian albums. The album eventually went gold (selling over 35,000 units) but it took a number of years to do so.

These early records demonstrated their new wave/ska/pop style, and were followed by near constant touring with almost 300 shows during 1981 as the band developed their status as a live act. In 1981, they signed Gary Grant as their tour manager, who then became co-manager a year later. Between touring commitments, the band released their third single in May 1981, "The Loved One", which was a cover of a 1966 song by Australian group The Loved Ones. The song was recorded at Studios 301 in Sydney, produced by Richard Clapton, and peaked in the Top 20.

The success of the single led to Clapton and the band returning to Studios 301 between July and August 1981 to create an album. In October 1981, their second album Underneath the Colours was released and became a hit in Australia peaking at No. 15.

Soon after recording sessions had finished, band members started work on outside projects. Beers, Jon and Andrew Farriss played on Clapton's solo album, The Great Escape. Hutchence recorded "Speed Kills", written by Don Walker of Cold Chisel for the soundtrack of the film Freedom directed by Scott Hicks. It was his first solo single and was released by WEA in early 1982. In January, INXS toured New Zealand as support act for Cold Chisel. Murphy eventually became convinced their future no longer lay with Deluxe Records.

RCA (who distributed Deluxe) had employed music lover Rockin Rod Woods, who had been promoting Eric Clapton, Split Enz and some of the world's biggest acts.  Woods was passionate about the band and brought key music people along to their gigs. He encouraged RCA to sign them worldwide because Murphy had played him some demos. Deluxe had been unable to attract international interest so the band decided to record a new song, "The One Thing" at their own expense, with Mark Opitz at Paradise Studios. The song turned out so well that Murphy hired Opitz to produce three more songs. Murphy approached WEA Australia with copies of the song, leading to INXS signing a recording deal in July 1982 with WEA for releases in Australia, South East Asia, Japan and New Zealand, Atco Records (a subsidiary of Atlantic Records) for North America and Polygram for Europe and the UK.

Murphy and the band were not entirely convinced that Opitz could produce an entire album that would attract international interest, so before recording their third album Pengilly, Hutchence and Andrew Farriss visited the UK and USA, with a view to selecting a suitable producer, only to find that no one they wanted was available and that most people advised them that Opitz's work on their single was as good as they could wish for.

To complete the band's contract with DeLuxe Records, INXS produced their first compilation album, INXSive, released in early 1982 for the Australian market only, featuring highlights from the band's first two studio albums, related B-sides, and two non-album singles. 

In mid-1982 they began recording at Rhinoceros Studios with Opitz. In October 1982, Shabooh Shoobah was released internationally on Atlantic/Atco Records, peaking at No. 52 on the US Billboard 200 and No. 46 on the Hot Pop Albums chart. In Australia it peaked at No. 5 and remained in the albums charts for 94 weeks. The single "The One Thing" brought them their first Top 30 hit in United States peaking at No. 30 on 28 May 1983, It was also a Top 20 hit in Canada, and peaked at No. 14 in Australia on 23 August 1982. "One Thing" was their first video to air on the fledgling MTV and significantly added to the ultimate success of the single.

13 February 1983, saw INXS play the Stop The Drop nuclear disarmament concert to 14,000 at the Myer Music Bowl in Melbourne, alongside Midnight Oil, Colin Hay, Redgum and Goanna. It was simulcast on Australian TV by Channel 10 and Radio 2MMM.

INXS undertook their first US performance in San Diego in March 1983, to a crowd of 24 patrons. Their first tour was as support for Adam and the Ants, then support for Stray Cats, The Kinks, Hall & Oates followed by The Go-Go's. INXS played alongside many of their contemporaries on New Wave Day in May 1983, at the US Festival in Devore, California. It was during this time that Grant, their co-manager, relocated permanently to New York to ensure a continual presence in the northern hemisphere. The band remained on the road in the US for most of the year, including support for Men at Work and by mid-1983 were headlining venues such as The Ritz in New York.

From "Original Sin" to Listen Like Thieves

After a performance in Toronto, Canada, the band was approached by producer Nile Rodgers; by September 1983, the band had recorded "Original Sin" (originally entitled "Brand New Day") at New York's Power Station Studios. Three tracks from Shabooh Shoobah were featured in the soundtrack for the 1984 film Reckless. The band then travelled to the UK to begin sessions on their fourth album with Nick Launay at the Manor Studios in Oxford.

The album The Swing, released in April 1984, received significant attention from around the world, as "Original Sin" became the band's first No. 1 single in Australia and was popular worldwide with fans and reviewers. During 1984, the single reached no. 1 in Australia (for two weeks in January), Argentina, and France; No. 6 in New Zealand; No. 11 in Canada; No. 23 in Switzerland; No. 31 in the Netherlands; and No. 58 in the U.S. However, "Original Sin" was largely ignored in the U.K., and INXS would not have any Top 50 chart success in the United Kingdom until the 1985 album Listen Like Thieves.

During 1984, INXS toured non-stop, performing across Europe, the UK, the US and Australia. By December 1984, The Swing had gone double platinum, making it one of the five biggest domestic albums in the history of Australian music at the time.

In March 1985, the band re-entered Sydney's Rhinoceros Studios to record the Listen Like Thieves album, together with producer Chris Thomas (Sex Pistols, Pink Floyd, The Pretenders, Elton John). As the band was finishing the recording sessions, Thomas stated that the album was not good enough and still had no "killer" track. Andrew produced a demo tape of a funk song he had been working on called "Funk Song No. 13" and evolved it into "What You Need".

Whilst the band was recording, WEA released Dekadance, a limited edition 12" Vinyl and cassette only EP of INXS remixes from their albums The Swing and Shabooh Shoobah.

On 19 May 1985, INXS won seven awards at the 1984 Countdown Music and Video Awards ceremony. They performed "Burn for You", dressed in Akubras (hats) and Drizabones (outdoor coats/oilskin jackets). The band performed five songs for the July 1985 Oz for Africa concert, in conjunction with the Live Aid benefit. Two INXS songs, "What You Need" and "Don't Change", were also in the BBC broadcast and are contained on Live Aid's four DVD boxed set released in 2004.

Listen Like Thieves was released in October 1985 to critical approval, reaching No. 3 on the Australian charts and No. 11 on the US charts. With the release of Listen Like Thieves, the band developed a rock sound influenced by Led Zeppelin and XTC while remaining true to the band's original roots in Aussie pubs. It was also the first album to feature songs written by a combination of band members, with Andrew Farris and Hutchence becoming the primary songwriters in the years to follow. The first U.S. single from the album, "This Time", stalled at No. 81 in late 1985, but the next single, "What You Need"—released there in early 1986—became a top five Billboard hit, bringing INXS its first break-out US success. The single was also a top 20 hit in Canada and reached No. 2 in Australia (September 1985), but only reached No. 51 on the UK charts. The British press dismissed the album, with New Musical Express calling the band 'INX-cusable' and a reviewer declaring Listen Like Thieves to be a 'complete and utter turkey'. In the United States, however, Rolling Stone wrote: "INXS rocks with passion and seals the deal with a backbeat that'll blackmail your feet."

In August 1985, INXS toured ahead of the release of Listen Like Thieves, touring South America before returning to Melbourne to play for Prince Charles and Princess Diana of Wales at a concert. The concert was filmed and later released on a home video entitled Living INXS; an edited version of the concert was played on MTV in the U.S. in 1985 on its Saturday night concert series. In November, December, January, and February, INXS toured North America, Europe, and New Zealand. The band then took a two-month break, with Andrew Farriss writing and producing "You're Gonna Get Hurt" for Jenny Morris (who had previously been a backing vocalist with the band), and Hutchence featuring in Richard Lowenstein's second feature film Dogs in Space. Lowenstein had previously made the video clip for "Dancing on the Jetty". Whilst a song from the movie, "Rooms for the Memory", written by Ollie Olsen, with vocals by Hutchence charted, the movie was received well by critics but was not a commercial success. Beginning in May 1986, the band performed 32 European shows (including support for Queen at their Live at Wembley '86 concert on 12 July), 42 U.S. shows, and 12 Australian shows. America's influential Musician magazine called INXS "the best live band in the world."

From "Good Times" to Kick

Whilst on an eight-month break before beginning work on a new album, their manager Murphy decided to stage a series of major outdoor concerts across Australia, featuring INXS, Jimmy Barnes, Models, Divinyls, Mental as Anything, The Triffids and I'm Talking. To promote the tour, INXS recorded two songs with Jimmy Barnes of Cold Chisel: The Easybeats cover "Good Times" and "Laying Down the Law" which Barnes co-wrote with Beers, Andrew Farriss, Jon Farriss, Hutchence and Pengilly. "Good Times" was used as the theme song for the Australian Made series of concerts in the summer of 1986–1987. It peaked at No. 2 on the Australian charts, and months later was featured in the Joel Schumacher film The Lost Boys and its soundtrack, allowing it to peak at No. 47 in the US on 1 August 1987.
After the success of "What You Need" and Listen Like Thieves, the band knew their new material would have to be even better and wanted every song on the album to be good enough to be a single. They recorded Kick in Sydney and Paris, produced by Chris Thomas. According to the 2005 official autobiography, Atlantic Records was not happy with the result; the label offered the band $1 million to go back to Australia and record another album, but the band declined.

Despite Atlantic's protests, Kick was released in October 1987 and provided the band with worldwide popularity. The album peaked at No. 1 in Australia, No. 3 on the US Billboard 200, No. 9 in UK, and No. 15 in Austria. It was an upbeat, confident album that yielded four Top 10 US singles: No. 1 single "Need You Tonight", "Devil Inside", "New Sensation", and "Never Tear Us Apart". "Need You Tonight" peaked No. 2 on the UK charts, No. 3 in Australia, and No. 10 in France. The band toured heavily behind the album throughout 1987 and 1988. The video for the 1987 INXS track "Mediate" (which played after the video for "Need You Tonight") replicated the format of Bob Dylan's video for "Subterranean Homesick Blues", even in its use of apparently deliberate errors. In September 1988, the band swept the MTV Video Music Awards with the video for "Need You Tonight/Mediate" winning in 5 categories. Kick was, by far, INXS's best-selling album of all time.

During 1989, Hutchence collaborated with Ian "Ollie" Olsen on a side project, Max Q, the two had previously worked together on Lowenstein's film Dogs in Space. The rest of the band also took a break to work on side projects, but soon returned to the studio to record their follow-up album to Kick.

1990–1997: From X to Elegantly Wasted
In October 1990, INXS released X, which was produced by Chris Thomas. The album peaked at No. 3 in Australia, No. 5 in the US, No. 2 in the UK, No. 5 in Switzerland and No. 10 in Sweden. It followed in the same vein as Kick, and added harmonica to some songs. X scored hits with "Suicide Blonde" and "Disappear" (both Top 10 in the US). "Suicide Blonde" peaked at No. 2 in Australia, No. 11 in the UK and in Switzerland. Other singles from X were "Bitter Tears" and "By My Side", which had less chart success.

INXS performed at Wembley Stadium on 13 July 1991, during their "Summer XS" tour stop in London to a sold-out audience of 74,000 fans. This performance was recorded and filmed to become Live Baby Live, a live album that was released in November 1991 and peaked in the Top 30 in the Australia and UK album charts. The album had less success on The Billboard 200. A video version of the album was also released under the same title.
This concert was the band's most well-attended show of all time; according to a 2017 article by Paul Donoughue of ABC.net.au, it "solidified [INXS's] place in pop history".

On 28 March 1992, INXS performed at the controversial Concert for Life at Centennial Park in Sydney (a fundraiser for the Victor Chang Cardiac Research Centre), and other performers included Crowded House, Yothu Yindi, Jenny Morris, Diesel, Ratcat and Def FX. Due to inclement weather, the expected attendance of 100,000 never came through, and the event only raised $500,000.

Welcome to Wherever You Are, produced by Mark Opitz and released in August 1992, was an experimental album using sitars and a 60-piece orchestra while adding a more "raw" sound. It received good critical reviews and went No. 1 in the UK and in Sweden; No. 2 in Australia and Switzerland, and No. 3 in Norway, but had less chart success in the US (peaking at No. 16). Singles from the album included "Taste It" and "Baby Don't Cry", which were Top 20 successes in UK but had less success in US and Australian markets.

Full Moon, Dirty Hearts, produced by Opitz, was released in November 1993 and peaked at No. 3 on the UK charts, No. 4 in Australia, No. 8 in Sweden, No. 9 in Switzerland, No. 14 in Norway; it did not reach the Top 50 in the US. The title track featured The Pretenders' Chrissie Hynde, and another track--"Please (You Got That)"—featured Ray Charles. The band made a full video album for the record using unknown Australian students to direct with help from Richard Lowenstein. Full Moon, Dirty Hearts received mixed reviews, and was the last record under INXS' contract with Atlantic in the States. The band took time off to rest and be with their families, while Hutchence remained in the public eye through modelling and film acting.

In 1997, the group released a comeback album titled Elegantly Wasted, which garnered mixed reviews. It fared respectably in Australia (No. 14), Canada (No. 14), France (No. 30), UK (No. 16) (where INXS had more success in the 1990s than in the 1980s), Belgium (No. 7), Switzerland (No. 13), but only No. 41 in US.

On 22 November 1997, Michael Hutchence was found dead in his Sydney Ritz-Carlton hotel room. On 6 February 1998, New South Wales State Coroner Derrick Hand presented his report, which ruled that Hutchence's death was a suicide while depressed and under the influence of drugs and alcohol. Despite the official coroner's report, there was continued speculation that Hutchence's death was accidental.

1997–2003: Transitional years

After Hutchence's death, INXS did not perform publicly for almost a year, and then only made a few one-off performances with different guest singers until 2000. On 14 November 1998, they played at the Mushroom 25 Concert with Jimmy Barnes fronting for two songs: "The Loved One" and "Good Times". On 12 June 1999, they headlined the opening of Stadium Australia in Sydney, with US singer-songwriter Terence Trent D'Arby and Russell Hitchcock as guest vocalists, they performed "New Sensation", "Kick", "Never Tear Us Apart" and "What You Need".

In December 2000, INXS performed a concert with singers Suze DeMarchi and Jon Stevens sharing the spotlight. The former lead singer of Australian band Noiseworks, Jon Stevens began singing with INXS on regular basis. INXS played as one of the headline acts at the Sydney 2000 Olympics and then toured through South America and Europe. Stevens was officially named a member of INXS in 2002, and the band started recording new material in November. Stevens left the band in October 2003 to pursue a solo career, and only recorded a contractual obligation song called "I Get Up."

2004–2005: Rock Star: INXS
INXS returned to the news in 2004 when it was announced that a new reality television program titled Rock Star: INXS would feature a contest to find a new lead vocalist for the band. The show, which debuted on the CBS network on 11 July 2005, featured 15 contestants vying for the position of lead singer. The show was executive produced by Survivors Mark Burnett and hosted by Brooke Burke and Jane's Addiction and former Red Hot Chili Peppers guitarist Dave Navarro.

On 20 September 2005, J.D. Fortune won the eleven-week competition, which culminated in his singing the Rolling Stones's "You Can't Always Get What You Want" and INXS' "What You Need" in the finale to become the new lead singer of INXS.

2005–2011: J.D. Fortune era

With Fortune as lead singer, INXS released the single "Pretty Vegas" on 4 October 2005. The single reached No. 5 on the iTunes Store ranking of daily most downloaded songs on its first day. It peaked at No. 9 in Australia and No. 37 on the Billboard Hot 100, and became a huge radio airplay hit in Fortune's native Canada. On 29 November 2005, Switch—the band's first album with Fortune as lead singer—was released in the United States via Epic Records. The band's new line-up started a world tour in support of Switch in January 2006. In September 2006, INXS and Epic Records parted ways. The band then performed at the 2006 NRL Grand Final.

INXS toured Australia and New Zealand in March 2007, with Simple Minds and support band Arrested Development. After the cancellation of a 31 August 2007 show in Cleveland, Ohio, INXS placed a statement on their website stating "Due to ongoing medical issues with Garry Beers' hand, the band's doctor has urged the band to not play more than three shows in a row or risk permanent damage to Garry's hand."

The band signed with Petrol Electric Records in December 2008, reuniting them with former manager Chris Murphy. On 16 February 2009, J.D. Fortune told Entertainment Tonight Canada that INXS had let him go from the band with a shake of the hand at an airport in Hong Kong. On 23 February 2009, Chris Murphy, INXS creative director and global business strategist and former manager, in an interview with The Daily Telegraph, said J.D. was not sacked and, in fact, "the band made it known to him that they had not ruled out seeing a return by Fortune." He also stated J.D. was next on his list to call regarding a major recording contract he was negotiating for the band. 
In an interview with Sun Media published on 6 March 2009, J.D. Fortune clarified his claim that he had been fired at an airport. After returning to Canada from Hong Kong, Fortune believed there were still two more legs of the INXS 2007 tour to complete. When the rest of the tour was cancelled and the band did not return his calls for 10 months, he believed he was out of the band.

On 30 November 2009, Andrew Farriss, Jon Farriss, and Kirk Pengilly performed an acoustic version of "Don't Change" with the Qantas Choir at the Pride of Australia Awards. On 8 December 2009, INXS announced they would be embarking on a world tour commencing with a performance in Vancouver for the 2010 Olympic Winter Games. The band announced on 11 February 2010 that J.D. Fortune would be vocalist for the performance at the 2010 Winter Olympics, but that it would be a one-off performance; the band added that a vocalist for the subsequent world tour had yet to be announced. The band performed at the Vancouver 2010 Winter Olympics on 24 February 2010 with guest singers J.D. Fortune and Argentine singer Deborah de Corral. 

On 22 April 2010, INXS announced that Fortune would again front the band for a performance on 10 July 2010 at Townsville, QLD, Australia, and then again on 16 July 2010 in Broome, WA, Australia During a radio interview with Kirk Pengilly and J.D. Fortune in July 2010 just before the Broome concert, Pengilly confirmed that Fortune had returned as the band's permanent singer. In August 2010, Petrol Records issued Australian radio stations with a one-track promo "Never Tear Us Apart" featuring Ben Harper on vocals, a preview from the upcoming INXS Michael Hutchence tribute album Original Sin. On 25 September 2010, the band performed before the 2010 AFL Grand Final. On 19 October 2010, it was announced in the Courier Mail that INXS, fronted by J.D. Fortune, would tour as part of the A Day on the Green winery concerts in February."

The band recorded an album in memory of Michael Hutchence titled Original Sin. Released in November 2010, the album featured well-known singers from Australia and around the world, including Ben Harper, Patrick Monahan, and Rob Thomas.

In March 2011, INXS confirmed they would return to the United Kingdom and headlining with support from New Zealand band Shihad for an outdoor event called Southern Sounds on Clapham Common, London on Saturday 11 June. The event was an all-Australian, New Zealand and South African celebration lineup, with INXS fronted by J.D. Fortune. INXS toured extensively throughout 2011 with singer J.D. Fortune to support the album Original Sin.

2011–2019: Later activities

The band released a demo of a song, called "Tiny Summer" in streaming format on their official website in September 2011, along with news that J.D. Fortune had left the band again and that Northern Irish singer-songwriter Ciaran Gribbin would be the band's frontman for their forthcoming tour of Australia, South America and Europe in November and December 2011. On 6 October 2012, INXS were the headline act at the annual charity ball organised by the Hong Kong Foreign Correspondent's Club.

During a concert on 11 November 2012 at the newly opened Perth Arena, while supporting Matchbox Twenty, INXS announced that they would no longer be touring. Kirk Pengilly stated that it was appropriate to finish where they had started 35 years earlier. Jon Farriss admitted that he was "getting teary" before the band performed their biggest hit, "Need You Tonight". In 2014, INXS released a tell-all history of the band on an Australian television interview special, The Story Behind INXS. During the interview, Jon Farriss made the statement, "Never say never" regarding the possibility that the band could record and perform more music in the future.

In 2013, Australian TV network Seven Network announced that it would produce a miniseries focusing on the band's behind-the-scenes stories called INXS: Never Tear Us Apart. Band member Tim Farriss was a pre-production consultant on the show. The miniseries commenced production at the end of June 2013 and premiered on 9 February 2014; the finale aired the following Sunday night (16 February 2014). The miniseries rated very highly for both nights and created a renewed interest in the band, which translated to a resurgence in sales of their music that brought them once again to the number one position on the Australian popular music charts. Luke Arnold was cast as Michael Hutchence, Alex Williams as Kirk Pengilly, Nicholas Masters as Tim Farriss, Hugh Sheridan as bass guitarist Gary Beers, Ido Drent as Jon Farriss and Andy Ryan as Andrew Farriss. In addition, Damon Herriman played band manager CM Murphy and Samantha Jade played Kylie Minogue. Given the popularity of this TV miniseries, there was talk of a Broadway musical and a feature film about INXS in the future.

In 2019, a documentary film was released about Michael Hutchence titled Mystify. A soundtrack was also released featuring INXS tracks.

Band membersFormer members Tim Farriss – lead guitar, keyboards, bass, backing vocals 
 Kirk Pengilly – rhythm and lead guitar, saxophone, backing and occasional lead vocals 
 Garry Gary Beers – bass, backing vocals 
 Andrew Farriss – keyboards, piano, rhythm guitar, harmonica, percussion, backing and occasional lead vocals 
 Jon Farriss – drums, percussion, keyboards, backing and occasional lead vocals 
 Michael Hutchence – lead vocals, occasional rhythm guitar 
 Jon Stevens – lead vocals 
 JD Fortune – lead vocals 
 Ciaran Gribbin – lead vocals, rhythm guitar Touring members'''
 Jimmy Barnes – lead vocals 
 Terence Trent D'Arby – lead vocals 
 Russell Hitchcock – lead vocals 
 Suze DeMarchi – lead vocals 
 Jenny Morris – backing vocals 

Timeline

Discography

 INXS (1980)
 Underneath the Colours (1981)
 Shabooh Shoobah (1982)
 The Swing (1984)
 Listen Like Thieves (1985)
 Kick (1987)
 X (1990)
 Welcome to Wherever You Are (1992)
 Full Moon, Dirty Hearts (1993)
 Elegantly Wasted (1997)
 Switch (2005)
 Original Sin (2010)

Legacy
INXS has been cited as an influence by several acts, such as The 1975, Maroon 5 and Savage Garden.

Recognition, awards, and nominations
According to the Recording Industry Association of America (RIAA), INXS has sold over 30 million units in the United States alone, making them the third-highest selling Australian music act in the United States behind AC/DC and The Bee Gees. INXS has sold an estimated 70  million records worldwide.

INXS has been nominated for numerous music awards, including ARIA Awards, Grammy Awards, and MTV Video Music Awards.

APRA Music Awards

!Ref.
|-
| 1988
| "What You Need"
| rowspan=4|Gold Award
| 
| 
|-
| 1989
| "Need You Tonight"
| 
| 
|-
| rowspan=2|1990
| "Devil Inside"
| 
| rowspan=2|
|-
| "New Sensation"
| 
|-
| 1991
| "Suicide Blonde"
| rowspan=2|Most Performed Australian Work Overseas
| 
| 
|-
| 1992
| "Disappear"
| 
| 
|-
| 2002
| "Precious Heart" (with Tall Paul)
| Most Performed Dance Work
| 
| 

ARIA Awards
INXS has won seven Australian Recording Industry Association (ARIA) Awards. The band was inducted into the ARIA Hall of Fame in 2001 alongside The Saints. This induction recognised their achievement of a "significant body of recorded work" and that they "had a cultural impact within Australia". INXS has won six other ARIA Awards, including three for 'Best Group' in 1987, 1989 and 1992.

|-
|rowspan="3"| 1987 ||| "Listen Like Thieves" || Best Group ||  
|-
|  rowspan="2"|"Good Times" (INXS & Jimmy Barnes) || Single of the Year ||  
|-
|  Highest Selling Single ||  
|-
| 1988 || INXS || Best Group ||  
|-
|rowspan="4"| 1989 |||INXS || Outstanding Achievement Award ||  
|-
|  rowspan="3"| "Never Tear Us Apart" || Best Video || 
|-
|  Best Group ||  
|-
|  Single of the Year||  
|-
|rowspan="2"| 1991 ||rowspan="2"|X || Album of the Year ||  
|-
|  Best Group ||  
|-
| 1992 ||| Live Baby Live || Best Group ||  
|-
|rowspan="2"| 1993 ||| "Baby Don't Cry", "Heaven Sent", "Taste It" || Engineer of the Year || 
|-
| Welcome to Wherever You Are || Best Group || 
|-
|rowspan="3"| 1994 ||| "The Gift" || Best Video ||  
|-
| "The Gift" || Highest Selling Single ||  
|-
| | Full Moon, Dirty Hearts || Best Group ||  
|-
| 2001 || INXS || Hall of Fame || 
|-
| 2004 || I'm Only Looking || Best Music DVD ||  
|-

ASCAP Pop Music Awards

!Ref.
|-
| 1987
| "What You Need"
| rowspan=6|Most Performed Songs
| 
| 
|-
| rowspan=4|1989
| "Devil Inside"
| 
| rowspan=4|
|-
| "New Sensation"
| 
|-
| "Never Tear Us Apart"
| 
|-
| "Need You Tonight"
| 
|-
| 1991 
| "Disappear"
| 
| 

Countdown AwardsCountdown was an Australian pop music TV series on national broadcaster ABC-TV from 1974 to 1987, it presented music awards from 1979 to 1987, initially in conjunction with magazine TV Week but then independently. The Countdown Music and Video Awards were succeeded by the ARIA Awards. INXS won seven awards at the 1984 awards ceremony, which was broadcast on 25 May 1985. On 20 April 1986 they won three further Countdown awards for 1985. They won further award in the final awards in 1986, from five nominations.

|-
| 1980 ||| INXS || Johnny O'Keefe New Talent || 
|-
|rowspan="3" | 1982 ||| Shabooh Shoobah || Best Australian Album || 
|-
|  | "One Thing" || Best Australian Single || 
|-
|  | INXS || Most Popular Group || 
|-
|rowspan="9" | 1984 ||| "Burn for You" || Best Group Performance in a Video || 
|-
|  | The Swing || Best Album || 
|-
|  | INXS || Most Popular Australian Group || 
|-
|  | Andrew Farriss, Michael Hutchence || Best Songwriter || 
|-
|  | "Burn for You" || Best Promotional Video || 
|-
| "Burn for You" || Best Single || 
|-
| "I Send a Message" || Best Single || 
|-
| INXS || Most Outstanding Achievement || 
|-
|  | Michael Hutchence || Most Popular Male || 
|-
|rowspan="3" | 1985 ||"What You Need" || Best Video || 
|-
| INXS || Most Popular Australian Group || 
|-
| INXS || Most Outstanding Achievement || 
|-
|rowspan="5" | 1986 ||"Kiss the Dirt" || Best Group Performance in a Video || 
|-
|"Good Times" (with Jimmy Barnes|| Best Group Performance in a Video|| 
|-
|"Kiss the Dirt"|| Best Video|| 
|-
|"Listen Like Thieves"|| Best Video|| 
|-
| INXS || Most Popular Australian Group || 

Grammy Awards
INXS received three Grammy Award nominations.

|-
| 1988 || Kick || Best Rock Performance by a Duo or Group with Vocal || 
|-
| 1990 || "Suicide Blonde" || Best Rock Performance by a Duo or Group with Vocal || 
|-
| 1994 || "Beautiful Girl" || Best Short Form Music Video || 

International Rock Awards
The International Rock Awards (1989–91) was a music award ceremony broadcast on ABC Television, to honor the top musicians in the genre of rock music.

|-
| 1989
| Themselves
| Artist of the Year 
| 

Mo Awards
The Australian Entertainment Mo Awards (commonly known informally as the Mo Awards), were annual Australian entertainment industry awards. They recognise achievements in live entertainment in Australia from 1975 to 2016. INXS won two awards in that time.
 (wins only)
|-
| 1986
| INXS
| Rock Group of the Year
| 
|-
| 1988
| INXS
| Rock Group of the Year
| 
|-

MTV Video Music Awards
INXS won five MTV Video Music Awards for their 1988 video "Need You Tonight/Mediate".

|-
|| 1986 ||| "What You Need" || Best Group Video || 
|-
|rowspan="9"| 1988 ||rowspan="8"|"Need You Tonight/Mediate" || Viewer's Choice || 
|-
| Video of the Year || 
|-
| Best Group Video || 
|-
| Best Concept Video || 
|-
| Breakthrough Video || 
|-
| Best Special Effects in a Video || 
|-
| Best Art Direction in a Video || 
|-
| Best Editing in a Video || 
|-
| "Devil Inside" || Best Editing in a Video || 
|-
| 1989 || "New Sensation" || Best Art Direction in a Video || 

Pollstar Concert Industry Awards

The Pollstar Concert Industry Awards is an annual award ceremony to honor artists and professionals in the concert industry.

|-
| rowspan="2" | 1986
| Themselves
| Next Major Arena Headliner
| 
|-
| rowspan="2" | Tour| Small Hall/Club of the Year
| 
|-
| 1989
| Most Creative Stage Production 
| 

Brit Awards

|-
| 1989 || INXS || Best International Group|| 
|-
|rowspan="2"|  1991 ||| INXS || Best International Group|| 
|-
| | Michael Hutchence || Best International Male|| 
|-
| 1992 || INXS || Best International Group|| 

Juno Awards

|-
| 1989
| INXS
| International Entertainer of the Year
|  

World Music Awards

|-
| 1993
| INXS 
| World's Best Selling Australian Artist
| 

Žebřík Music Awards

!Ref.
|-
| rowspan=3|1997
| Michael Hutchence
| Best International Personality
| 
| rowspan=3|
|-
| "Elegantly Wasted"
| Best International Video
| 
|-
| The Death of Michael Hutchence
| Best International Průser
| 

Notes

References

External links

 
 
 [ INXS discography] at Billboard''
 INXS discography at MusicBrainz
 
 INXS – the Band at h2g2
 

 
ARIA Award winners
Brit Award winners
Dance-rock musical groups
Funk rock musical groups
Australian new wave musical groups
Australian rock music groups
ARIA Hall of Fame inductees
Atlantic Records artists
Atco Records artists
Epic Records artists
Polydor Records artists
Mercury Records artists
East West Records artists
Warner Music Group artists
Musical groups established in 1977
Musical groups from Sydney
Musical groups disestablished in 2012
1977 establishments in Australia
2012 disestablishments in Australia
Pub rock musical groups
Australian alternative rock groups
Sibling musical groups